Dentellaria is a genus of air-breathing land snails, terrestrial pulmonate gastropod mollusks in the family Pleurodontidae.

Species
Species within the genus Dentellaria include:
 Dentellaria amabilis (C. B. Adams, 1850)
 Dentellaria anomala (Pfeiffer, 1849)
 Dentellaria atavus (Pfeiffer, 1859)
 Dentellaria bronni (L. Pfeiffer, 1846)
 Dentellaria candescens (C. B. Adams, 1850)
 Dentellaria cara (C. B. Adams, 1849)
 Dentellaria catadupae (H. B. Baker, 1935)
 Dentellaria invalida (C. B. Adams, 1850)
 Dentellaria okeniana (L. Pfeiffer, 1845)
 Dentellaria pallescens (C. B. Adams, 1851)
 Dentellaria peracutissima (C. B. Adams, 1845)
 Dentellaria perplexa (Férussac, 1832)
 Dentellaria picturata (C. B. Adams, 1849)
 Dentellaria schroeteriana (L. Pfeiffer, 1845)
 Dentellaria simson (Pfeiffer, 1852)
 Dentellaria sinuata (O. F. Müller, 1774)
 Dentellaria sloaneana (Pfeiffer, 1868)
 Dentellaria strangulata (C. B. Adams, 1849)
 Dentellaria tridentina (Férussac, 1832)
 Dentellaria valida (C. B. Adams, 1850)
Synonyms
 Dentellaria pachygastra (Gray, 1834): synonym of Pleurodonte pachygastra (Gray, 1834)
 Dentellaria tridentula Miller, 1878: synonym of Isomeria bituberculata (L. Pfeiffer, 1853): synonym of Isomeria bourcieri (Reeve, 1852) (junior synonym)
 Dentellaria latidentata Miller, 1878: synonym of Isomeria bituberculata (L. Pfeiffer, 1853): synonym of Isomeria bourcieri (Reeve, 1852) (junior synonym)

References

External links 
 Schumacher C.F. (1817). Essai d'un nouveau système des habitations des vers testacés. Schultz, Copenghagen. iv + 288 pp., 22 pls.

Pleurodontidae
Gastropod genera